Abbey Wood is a district in south London, England

Abbey Wood may also refer to:

 Abbey Wood, Flixton, Suffolk, England
 Abbey Wood (Havering)
 Lesnes Abbey Woods
 MoD Abbey Wood
 Abbey Wood railway station
 Filton Abbey Wood railway station